The  is a DC electric multiple unit (EMU) commuter train type operated by Kyushu Railway Company (JR Kyushu) on Chikuhi Line and Fukuoka Subway Kuko Line through-running services in Kyushu, Japan, since 5 February 2015. The entire fleet of 6 six-car sets (36 vehicles) was scheduled to be in service by the start of the 14 March 2015 timetable revision.

Design

The fleet of 36 vehicles (6 six-car sets) will be built by Hitachi at a cost of approximately 5.7 billion yen, with styling overseen by industrial designer Eiji Mitooka. The new trains are designed to offer improved universal accessibility. Fully enclosed permanent-magnet synchronous motors (PMSM) are used to reduce environmental noise and reduce power consumption by approximately 57% compared with existing 103 series trains.

Operations

Formations
The 305 series trains are formed as six-car sets as shown below, numbered W1 to W6, consisting of four motored intermediate cars and two non-powered driving trailer cars. Car 1 is at the Nishi-Karatsu end.

Cars 3 and 5 each have two PS402K single-arm pantographs.

Interior
Passenger accommodation consists of longitudinal bench seating with space for wheelchairs or strollers in each car. Each row of seats has a different seat cover design. Large liquid-crystal display screens are used for providing passenger information, and LED lighting is used throughout. Car 1 features wooden flooring of the same design as that used in JR Kyushu's luxury cruising train Seven Stars in Kyushu. Car 1 also has a universal access toilet.

History
The first set, numbered W1, was delivered from the manufacturer Hitachi in Kudamatsu, Yamaguchi to JR Kyushu's Kokura Depot in November 2014, and moved to Karatsu Depot in December 2014.

A special public preview run was held on 31 January 2015, ahead of the formal entry into service on 5 February.

Fleet details
, the fleet consists of six sets as follows.

References

External links

 JR Kyushu press release (31 July 2014) 

Electric multiple units of Japan
Kyushu Railway Company
Train-related introductions in 2015
Hitachi multiple units
1500 V DC multiple units of Japan